Solquca (also, Solqıça, Solgudzha, and Solgudzha-Kazmalar) is a village in the Qabala Rayon of Azerbaijan.  The village is part of the municipality of Mıxlıqovaq.

References 

Populated places in Qabala District